George Frederick Lessons (30 August 1883 – 7 September 1918), sometimes known as Frank Lessons, was an English professional footballer who made nearly 250 appearances as a centre forward in the Southern League for Northampton Town. He also managed the club and earlier in his career played in the Football League for Nottingham Forest.

Personal life 
Lessons served as a lance corporal in the Northamptonshire Regiment during the First World War and was killed on the Western Front on 7 September 1918, just over two months before the armistice. He is buried in Éterpigny British Cemetery.

Career statistics

Honours 
Northampton Town

Southern League First Division: 1908–09

References

1883 births
1918 deaths
Footballers from Stockport
English footballers
Association football forwards
Jardine's Athletic F.C. players
Nottingham Forest F.C. players
Northampton Town F.C. players
English Football League players
Southern Football League players
English football managers
Military personnel from Manchester
Northampton Town F.C. managers
Southern Football League managers
British Army personnel of World War I
Northamptonshire Regiment soldiers
British military personnel killed in World War I